Catforth is a village in the English civil parish of Woodplumpton and the City of Preston district, in Lancashire, England. There is a village hall and the last remaining of Catforth's pubs, The Running Pump, is situated on Catforth Road, which is the village's main road. There is a Roman Catholic church and a primary school.

See also

Listed buildings in Woodplumpton

References

External links

Geography of the City of Preston
The Fylde
Villages in Lancashire